Roman is a city located in the central part of Western Moldavia, a traditional region of Romania. It is located 46 km east of Piatra Neamț, in Neamț County at the confluence of the rivers Siret and Moldova.

Its name was taken from Moldavian Voivode Roman I of Moldavia. From here prince Roman realized the centralization of Moldavia, the city of Roman being the capital of the Lower Country of Moldavia.

History

The earliest mention of the city is in the Novgorod Chronicle (dated between 1387 and 1392). Five years later, the name appeared on a donation deed. The city is mentioned in a Moldavian document, signed by Moldavia's Voivode Roman I, on March 30. The document is one of the first of documents of the then-young state of Moldavia, being the first which holds a fully legible version of the Moldavia seal, bearing the aurochs, the moon, the star, and the flower, still in use on coat of arms of Moldova.

Roman became a diocesan see in September 14, 1408, when Voivode Roman I's son, Alexandru cel Bun, established an Orthodox bishopric in the city. The representatives of the Catholic population of Roman, shepherded by the Bishop of Baia, attended the Council of Constance in 1412. 

Later on in the late 15th century, Ștefan cel Mare built a new stone fortress on the left bank of the Siret River, to replace the old earthen one. Several documents from 1458, 1465, and 1488 during Ștefan's reign mention the Cathedral of Saint Paraskeva (Paraschiva) in Roman. In 1467, the fortress resisted the siege of the Hungarian army under King Matthias Corvinus, before the Battle of Baia. In 1476, an Ottoman army, led by Mehmed II, besieged the new fortress again, with the Moldavians retreating after the Battle of Valea Albă.

Petru Rareș ordered the construction of a new episcopal see on the same spot in 1542. The old fortress was apparently destroyed by Dumitrașcu Cantacuzino, following Ottoman command, together with all other Moldavian fortresses. One of the last mentions of it dates back to 1561–1563 during the reign of Ioan Iacob Heraclid. The catholic community had its rights restored around the same time, in 1562, as Ioan Belusiuș, an agent of the Holy Roman Emperor Ferdinand I, wrote his master from Roman, after the severe limitations under Alexandru Lăpușneanu. In 1623, the Catholic community was described by the Franciscan missionary Andreas Bogoslavici in a letter sent to Rome, as Hungarian that understood and used Romanian. The Catholics appear to have a church dedicated to Saint Peter.

In 1569, Lady Ruxandra Lăpușneanu built an Orthodox church dedicated to the Holy Virgin (Precista Mare) on the same spot the eponym church is placed today. In 1595, the church Sfinții Voievozi was built. The current Armenian Orthodox Church was built in 1610.

Some demographic data from 1641, recorded by the Vicar of Sofia, who was passing through Roman, shows there were apparently 1,500 Eastern Orthodox, 450 Armenian Orthodox, and 30 Hungarian Catholics.

A major personality of the city was Orthodox bishop Dosoftei, who translated the Psalter into Romanian in 1665–1671. In December 1691, Miron Costin, one of the first historians and writers in Romanian, was decapitated here on the orders of Prince Constantin Cantemir (Dimitrie Cantemir's father). Costin was in custody, being carried from Bărboși to Iași, where he hoped to prove his innocence; a few days earlier, the chronicler's brother had been killed in Iași, being believed to have attempted to obtain the throne for himself.

The first hospital in Roman was built in 1798 on the place where the Municipal Hospital Precista Mare is located today. Talmud Torah, one of the first Jewish schools in the Principality of Moldova, was inaugurated in 1817, an important event in itself as Moldova did not grant citizenship to Jews.

Roman became a railway hub in the 19th century, when the second railway in Romania was opened in December 1869, from Roman to Suceava (Ițcani). One year later, on December 27, 1870, The Bucharest-Galați-Roman railway was also opened, linking Roman to the capital via Mărășești, Tecuci, Galați, Brăila, and Buzău. Right after the inauguration, this railway was closed due to technical problems, but it was reestablished on September 13, 1872. At the same time, after a reluctant government gave its long-waited approval, the first high school of the city, Roman-Vodă, was opened on September 30 in the building that is still in use today as that of School No. 1.

In the Communist era, the city lost the county capital status, being included, in 1950-52 and 1956–68, in Bacău Region, in 1952–56 in Iași Region, and then, in 1968, in Neamț County. It also became the target of industrialization: in 1957, the steel tubes factory started production. Roman became an important industrial center in Romania.

After the fall of communism in 1989, most of the heavy industry, relying strongly on state subsidies, went bankrupt and Roman's economy struggled. The steel tubes factory was privatized, and it is now owned by the Mittal Steel Company, and the economy started to recover.

Geography and demographics

Roman is located in north-eastern Romania, in Neamț County, in the historic region of Moldavia, at the mouth of the Moldova River, a tributary to the Siret.

Natives
 
 Daniel Baston
 Ernest Broșteanu
 F. Brunea-Fox
 Sergiu Celibidache
 Corneliu Codreanu (footballer)
 Gheorghe Dănilă
 Iliuță Dăscălescu
 Constantin Drugă
 Zicman Feider
 Gheorghe Flondor
 Bianca Ghelber
 Serban Ghenea
 Adrian Gheorghiu
 Virgil Gheorghiu (poet)
 Ion V. Gruia
 Ion Ionescu de la Brad
 
 Constantin Istrati
 Ana Maria Iuganu
 Mihail Jora
 Zizi Lambrino
 Ciprian Manea
 Andreea Marin
 
 Petru Th. Missir
 Vasile Morțun
 Tereza Pîslaru
 Mădălin Popa
 Cornel Popescu
 Andrei Răuță
 
 
 Simona Spiridon
 
 Ion Strat
 Sorin Tabacariu
 Sorin Ovidiu Vântu
 Haralamb Zincă

Twin towns – sister cities

Roman is twinned with:

 Dilijan, Armenia
 Edineț, Moldova
 Gedera, Israel
 Grugliasco, Italy
 Ștefan Vodă, Moldova
 Sunchang, South Korea
 Samothraki, Greece

References

External links

 Roman-Romania.ro – website
  Ziarul de Roman – Local newspaper
 History of Roman Jews 
  Melidonium  magazine
 

Cities in Romania
1234 establishments in Europe
Capitals of former Romanian counties
Populated places in Neamț County
Localities in Western Moldavia